Lockhart may refer to:

Lockhart (surname)

Places

Australia 

Lockhart, New South Wales
Lockhart River, Queensland
Lockhart River, Western Australia

United States 

Lockhart, Alabama
Lockhart, Florida
Lockhart, Minnesota
Lockhart, South Carolina
Lockhart, Texas
Lockhart, West Virginia
Lockhart Township, Minnesota
Lockhart Stadium, Fort Lauderdale, Florida

Other uses
Lockhart, a codename for the Xbox Series S video game console

See also
 Lockharts, California, United States
 Lockheart, a surname